Edward Lavin Girroir (August 26, 1871 – May 8, 1932) was a Canadian politician.

Born August 26 or 27, 1871 in Tracadie, Nova Scotia, he was the son of William Girroir and Anne (Lavin) Girroir.  He had a twin brother, Hubert, who died one month after their birth, on September 25, 1871.

Girroir was educated at Saint Francis Xavier College and Dalhousie University.  He was a Halifax lawyer, and also lectured on international law at Saint Francis Xavier University in Antigonish, Nova Scotia. In 1902, he married Lauretta Maude Corbin; she died in 1909.  Senator Girroir and Mrs. Girroir (née Corbin) had at least one son, Edward Lavin, Jr., born February 10, 1907.

In 1900, 1905 and 1908, Girroir ran unsuccessfully for the House of Commons of Canada as a Conservative candidate in the federal riding of Antigonish.

In 1911, he was elected to the Nova Scotia House of Assembly as a Liberal-Conservative representing the provincial riding of Antigonish.

Girroir was appointed to the Senate of Canada on November 20, 1912, as a Conservative representing the senatorial division of Antigonish.  He was the second Acadian senator from Nova Scotia.  He died in office on May 8, 1932.

References
 
 Allison, D & Tuck, CE History of Nova Scotia, Vol. 3 (1916) pp. 326–7
 https://www.novascotiagenealogy.com/ItemView.aspx?ImageFile=1907-99200437&Event=birth&ID=205837
 https://www.novascotiagenealogy.com/ItemView.aspx?ImageFile=1802-105&Event=birth&ID=6600

1871 births
1932 deaths
Acadian people
Canadian senators from Nova Scotia
Conservative Party of Canada (1867–1942) candidates for the Canadian House of Commons
Conservative Party of Canada (1867–1942) senators
People from Antigonish County, Nova Scotia